Some Other Spring Blues And Ballads is an album by Norwegian vocalist Karin Krog with American saxophonist Dexter Gordon recorded in Norway in 1970 and originally released on the Sonet label in Europe.

Reception
The Allmusic review stated: "This is one of the most accessible Karin Krog releases around and is recommended".

Track listing 
 "Some Other Spring" (Arthur Herzog, Jr., Irene Kitchings) - 5:00   
 "Blue Monk" (Abbey Lincoln, Thelonious Monk) - 3:55   
 "How Insensitive" (Antônio Carlos Jobim, Norman Gimbel) - 4:30   
 "Blue Eyes" (Berndt Egerbladh, Karin Krog) - 4:50   
 "Jelly, Jelly" (Billy Eckstein, Earl Hines) - 4:55   
 "I Wish I Knew" (Harry Warren, Mack Gordon) - 5:25   
 "Everybody's Somebody's Fool"  (Ace Adams, Lionel Hampton) - 4:35   
 "Shiny Stockings" (Frank Foster, Ella Fitzgerald) - 3:40

Personnel 
Karin Krog - vocals
Dexter Gordon - tenor saxophone, vocals
Kenny Drew - piano
Niels-Henning Ørsted Pedersen - bass
Espen Rud - drums

References 

1970 albums
Sonet Records albums
Karin Krog albums
Dexter Gordon albums